Alastair Forsyth (born 5 February 1976) is a Scottish professional golfer.

Amateur career
Forsyth was born in Glasgow, Scotland and grew up supporting Rangers. He was a member of a winning Great Britain & Ireland Jacques Léglise Trophy team in 1994 and he won the 1996 Scottish Amateur Stroke Play Championship.

Professional career
Forsyth turned professional in 1998. He won the MasterCard Tour Order of Merit in 1999, having won the St Omer Open Championship (not a European Tour event at the time) during the season.

Forsyth has played on the European Tour since 2000, after being medalist at the qualifying school in 1999. In his debut season, he just missed out on the Sir Henry Cotton Rookie of the Year award, which went to England's Ian Poulter. His best season to date was 2003, when he finished 19th on the European Tour Order of Merit. His first tour victory came at the 2002 Carlsberg Malaysian Open and his second came at the 2008 Madeira Islands Open BPI - Portugal.

In May 2008, he overtook Colin Montgomerie to become the highest ranked Scottish player on the Official World Golf Rankings. He tied for ninth place in the 2008 PGA Championship.

Amateur wins
1996 Scottish Amateur Stroke Play Championship

Professional wins (11)

European Tour wins (2)

1Co-sanctioned by the Asian Tour

European Tour playoff record (2–1)

MasterCard Tour wins (1)
1999 St Omer Open Championship

Other wins (8)
1998 Scottish Under-25 Championship, Kilspindie Assistants Autumn Classic
1999 Northern Open, Scottish Assistants' Championship
2000 Scottish PGA Championship
2019 Northern Open, Titleist & FootJoy PGA Professional Championship
2022 Scottish PGA Championship

Playoff record
Challenge Tour playoff record (0–1)

Results in major championships

Note: Forsyth never played in the Masters Tournament.

CUT = missed the half-way cut
"T" = tied

Results in World Golf Championships

"T" = Tied

Team appearances
Amateur
Jacques Léglise Trophy (representing Great Britain and Ireland): 1994 (winners)
European Youths' Team Championship (representing Scotland): 1996 (winners)
European Amateur Team Championship (representing Scotland): 1997

Professional
World Cup (representing Scotland): 2002, 2003, 2004, 2008, 2009
PGA Cup (representing Great Britain and Ireland): 2019

See also
2013 European Tour Qualifying School graduates

References

External links

Scottish male golfers
European Tour golfers
Golfers from Glasgow
1976 births
Living people